The 2021–22 Niagara Purple Eagles men's basketball team represented Niagara University in the 2021–22 NCAA Division I men's basketball season. The Purple Eagles, led by third-year head coach Greg Paulus, played their home games at the Gallagher Center in Lewiston, New York as members of the Metro Atlantic Athletic Conference.

Previous season
The Purple Eagles finished the 2020–21 season 9–11, 7–9 in MAAC play to finish in a tie for fifth place. As the No. 5 seed in the MAAC tournament, they defeated No. 4 seed Marist in the quarterfinals, before being upset by No. 9 seed Iona, in the semifinals.

Roster

Schedule and results

|-
!colspan=12 style=""| Exhibition

|-
!colspan=12 style=""| Regular season

|-
!colspan=9 style=""| MAAC tournament

Source

References

Niagara Purple Eagles men's basketball seasons
Niagara Purple Eagles
Niagara Purple Eagles men's basketball
Niagara Purple Eagles men's basketball